David John Orrell (born 1962 in Edmonton) is a Canadian writer and mathematician. He received his doctorate in mathematics from the University of Oxford. His work in the prediction of complex systems such as the weather, genetics and the economy has been featured in New Scientist, the Financial Times, The Economist, Adbusters, BBC Radio, Russia-1, and CBC TV. He now conducts research and writes in the areas of systems biology and economics, and runs a mathematical consultancy Systems Forecasting. He is the son of theatre historian and English professor John Orrell.

His books have been translated into over ten languages. Apollo's Arrow: The Science of Prediction and the Future of Everything was a national bestseller and finalist for the 2007 Canadian Science Writers' Award. Economyths: Ten Ways Economics Gets It Wrong was a finalist for the 2011 National Business Book Award.

Criticism of use of mathematical models
A consistent topic in Orrell’s work is the limitations of mathematical models, and the need to acknowledge these limitations if we are to understand the causes of forecast error. He argues for example that errors in weather prediction are caused primarily by model error, rather than the butterfly effect. Economic models are seen as particularly unrealistic. In Truth or Beauty: Science and the Quest for Order, he suggests that many such theories, along with areas of physics such as string theory, are motivated largely by the desire to conform with a traditional scientific aesthetic, that is currently being subverted by developments in complexity science.

Quantum theory of money and value
Orrell is considered a leading proponent of quantum finance and quantum economics. In The Evolution of Money (coauthored with journalist Roman Chlupatý) and a series of articles he proposed a quantum theory of money and value, which states that money has dualistic properties because it combines the properties of an owned and valued thing, with those of abstract number. The fact that these two sides of money are incompatible leads to its complex and often unpredictable behavior. In Quantum Economics: The New Science of Money he argued that these dualistic properties feed up to affect the economy as a whole.

Books 

 Revised and extended edition of 2010 book.

 Published in the U.S. as The Future of Everything: The Science of Prediction.

See also 
 Anticipatory science forecasts
 Complex systems
 Mathematical model
 Computer model
 Chaos theory
 Systems biology
 Quantum economics

References

External links

 David Orrell's homepage
 Systems Forecasting
 Video of talk on money given for Marshall McLuhan lecture, Berlin 2015
 Video of talk on prediction given at TEDx Park Kultury, Moscow in 2012
 ABC News - Good Morning America (excerpts from Apollo's Arrow)
 National Post's review of Apollo's Arrow
 Sunday Times review of Truth or Beauty
  David Orrell Interview with Rishabh Chaddha on Substack.com

Canadian non-fiction writers
Canadian mathematicians
Writers from Edmonton
Systems biologists
1962 births
Complex systems theory
Living people